Basketbalový klub Pardubice, mostly known for sponsorship reasons as KVIS Pardubice is a Czech professional basketball club based in the city of Pardubice. They play in the Czech National Basketball League (NBL), the highest competition in the Czech Republic.

Season by season

Honours
Czech League
 Third place (2): 2015–16, 2016–17
Czech Cup
 Champions (2): 1993–94, 2015–16
Alpe Adria Cup
 Champions (1): 2019–20
 Runners-up (1): 2021–22

Roster

External links 
Official Site 
Eurobasket.com BK Pardubice Page

Basketball teams in the Czech Republic
Basketball teams established in 1956